Ivan Maksakov (born February 25, 1983 in Russia, Balakovo) was one of the three men behind the start of DDoS attacks for hire and extortion.  Ivan was most famously known as "eXe", but he also used the nicknames: NASA, b-boy, X, x890, and x3m1st.

A multinational law enforcement group made up of British, American, and Russian private individuals and law enforcement agents captured Maksakov, Alexander Petrov, and Denis Stepanov.

The three men were at the heart of an extortion ring which was extorting money from banks, Internet casinos, and other web based businesses.  Reported damages caused by Maksakov, Petrov, and Stenanov range in the tens of millions of dollars.  On October 8, 2007, Maksakov, Petrov, Stepanov were found guilty and sentenced to eight years in prison in the Russian Federation with a 100,000 ruble penalty.

See also 
Barrett Lyon
Denial of service attack
Fatal System Error

References

External links 
Eight Years for Extorting Millions

Living people
1983 births